The canton of Beauvais-1 is an administrative division of the Oise department, northern France. It was created at the French canton reorganisation which came into effect in March 2015. Its seat is in Beauvais.

It consists of the following communes:
 
Beauvais (partly)
Fouquenies
Herchies
Milly-sur-Thérain
Le Mont-Saint-Adrien
Pierrefitte-en-Beauvaisis
Saint-Germain-la-Poterie
Savignies

References

Cantons of Oise